Novators is a Russian popular-science cartoon which tells about the inventions of Russian scientists.

Plot
It all starts on an ordinary day, when an alien literally falls on the heads of perfectly ordinary school children. The kids quickly find a common language with the visitor from space, and soon the fun intergalactic company is joined by a four-legged friend - hamster. The earthlings invited the alien to use an old refrigerator to use as spare parts for the broken flying saucer. But the refrigerator instead becomes useful in order to create a time machine for him.

The curiosity of the heroes leads them into a totally unexpected situation. They find themselves having to cope with the breakdown of the time machine, cold glacial period, unfriendly Papuan tribe.

Knowledge, wit, friendship and the ability to do something with their hands help the friends successfully overcome all difficulties while making different scientific discoveries.

Background
All of the inventions that aid the heroes of the cartoon are based on original ideas and patented inventions by Russian scientists.

Characters 
Phil — cheerleader and 12-year-old captain of the fearless company of young travellers in time, space and exciting worlds of the human intellect.

Nana — Phil's younger sister.

Neo (Neon) — charming alien from the planet Yum, who appeared on Earth because his flying saucer broke down. The accident happened near the house Phil and Nana, who invited Neo to stay with them in the attic.

Tesla — prankish pet hamster, saved by the children from the cat. He loves to eat and consumes a lot of food. Was the absolute master of the attic, before the alien appeared. Fortunately, Tesla and Neo quickly found a common language.

List of episodes 

 Kinky guests of the old attic
 Include helpful blob
 Operation "Clean hands"
 Time fridge 
 Mask of the ice age
 The magic power of stormy water
 Treasure of Zapatista bottle
 Dental magic
 When cans are closing
 Adventure with a twinkle
 For the phantom with a lantern
 The smoke of the stone age
 Royal fir-tree
 The energy of sea tides
 How to swell the enemy
 Miracle-fuel
 Underwater Safari
 Hunters
 Tent of Hawaiian Plaksa
 Magic wand the Navigator
 Marathon flight
 Jumping on the water
 At Leonardo
 Clean thing
 Humpbacked horse with the motor
 Service for Rome

See also 
History of Russian animation

Links 
 Official website
 Carousel channel

2011 Russian television series debuts
2015 Russian television series endings
Russian children's animated science fiction television series
STS (TV channel) original programming
Carousel (TV channel) original programming